Pauline Perlmutter Steinem (August 4, 1864 — January 5, 1940) was a Jewish American suffragist born in Poland. In 1904, she became the first woman to be elected to the Board of Education in Toledo, Ohio, as well as to any public office there, thereby becoming in all likelihood, the first Jewish woman, and definitely one of the earliest to hold, elected public office in the United States.

She rescued many members of her family from the Holocaust. She was also the grandmother of feminist Gloria Steinem.

Early life
Pauline Perlmutter was born in Radziejow, Kingdom of Prussia (now located in Poland) in 1864 (according to her tombstone; some sources give 1863 or 1866 as the year), the daughter of Reform Jewish Russian emigrants Hayman Hirsch Perlmutter, a cantor, and Bertha Slisower Perlmutter. She was raised in Bavaria, attending a teacher training program there.

Career
In 1914, Pauline Perlmutter Steinem wrote: 
"People say: 'Women cannot succeed in certain fields.' How do we know what women can do, when we have never yet allowed them to try? No man knows what woman would do, if she were free to develop the powers latent within her, nor does she herself know as yet."

In education
Steinem moved to the US state of Ohio as a young wife and mother. Her teacher training in Bavaria informed a lifetime of activism for education.

She was the first woman to serve on the Toledo Board of Education; when she was elected in 1904, she became the first woman to hold public office in Toledo, and possibly the first Jewish woman to hold elected public office in the United States. She was elected on a coalition ticket along with socialists and anarchists.

She founded a public vocational school, the Macomber Vocational High School, and she worked for juvenile court reform in Ohio. She was also appointed to the board of trustees for the Toledo Public Library.

In Jewish organizations
She served as the chair of the Toledo chapter of the National Council of Jewish Women, and was national chair of that organization's Sabbath School committee. She was also president of the Hebrew Associated Charities and Loan Association, a mutual aid society. Although Steinem identified as Jewish, she also followed Theosophy. Steinem identified as a universalist rather than a Zionist.

In women's suffrage
As an active member of the National Woman Suffrage Association, she was a chairwoman of their educational committee and a delegate to the International Council of Women, held in Switzerland in 1908. She was head of the Ohio Woman's Suffrage Association from 1908 to 1911, and president of Toledo Council of Women, as well as president of the Toledo Federation of Women's Clubs.

Personal life
In 1884, Pauline Perlmutter married Joseph Steinem, a German-born businessman who was living in Toledo, Ohio. They had four sons together, Edgar, Jesse, Clarence, and Leo; Edgar was born in Germany in 1885; the younger three sons were born in Ohio. She was widowed when Joseph died in 1929. Pauline Perlmutter Steinem died in 1940, aged 75 years, in Toledo.

Her son, Leo Steinem, was the father of American feminist Gloria Steinem, and of lawyer and gem expert Susanne Steinem Patch.

References

External links

1864 births
1940 deaths
American people of German-Jewish descent
American people of Polish-Jewish descent
American people of Russian-Jewish descent
American Reform Jews
American suffragists
American Theosophists
American women educators
Educators from Ohio
German Reform Jews
Jewish socialists
People from Toledo, Ohio
Polish Reform Jews
Prussian emigrants to the United States
Reform anti-Zionists
Reform Jewish feminists